The 2010 Cactus Pheasant Classic was held October 28–31 in Brooks, Alberta, Canada. It was the only event taking place in Week 8 of the Men's World Curling Tour for the 2010-11 curling season. The total purse for the event was $70,000 Canadian dollars (CAD). The event format was a 24-team triple knockout, with eight teams qualifying into a single-elimination playoff round to determine the champion. The winner, was to qualify for the 2010 Canada Cup of Curling, but the winning rink (Kevin Martin) had already qualified.

Participating teams

Draw

A Event

B Event

C Event

Playoffs

Payout

External links
Official event site
WCT event site

Cactus Pheasant Classic, 2010
Brooks, Alberta
2010 in Alberta
Curling in Alberta